Ernst Hürlimann (born 19 October 1934) is a Swiss rower who competed in the 1960 Summer Olympics.

He was born in Wädenswil. In 1960 he won the bronze medal with his partner Rolf Larcher in the double sculls event.

References

1934 births
Living people
Swiss male rowers
Olympic rowers of Switzerland
Rowers at the 1960 Summer Olympics
Olympic bronze medalists for Switzerland
Olympic medalists in rowing
People from Wädenswil
Medalists at the 1960 Summer Olympics
Sportspeople from the canton of Zürich
20th-century Swiss people